Jain temples, Pavagadh is a group of seven Jain temples located in Pavagadh Hill in the state of Gujarat. These temples are part of the UNESCO World Heritage Site of Champaner-Pavagadh Archaeological Park.

Jain tradition 
Pavagadh hill is considered one of the four sacred regions where moksha can be attained.

History 
The Pavagadh temples dates back to the 13th century.

About temples 
The Pavagadh temples are famous for their architecture and are also part of the UNESCO World Heritage Site of Champaner-Pavagadh Archaeological Park. Pavagadh has three Jain temples complexes that includes a total of seven Jain temples, a dharamshala and an old-age home. The three Jain complexes are Bavanderi or Naulakhi temples, Chandraprabha and Suparshvanatha temple and group around Parshvanatha temple. Bavanderi Naulakhi temples are the ruins of subsidary shrine of once a large chaumukhi temple with entrance in four cardinal direction. The pillars inside the temple having carvings that bear a resemblance to Luna Vasahi. Chandraprabha and Suparshvanatha temple are two small temples built near Kalika Mata temple. Parshvanatha temple is the main temple in this group and surrounded by ruins of small temples.

These temples are visited by over 22 lakh visitors annually with 1 lakh devotees visiting daily during navaratri fair.

Gallery

See also 
 Girnar Jain temples
 Jama Mosque, Champaner

References

Citation

Source

Book

Web

External links

Pavagadh
Pavagadh